Island Transit is a public transit company operating in Galveston, Texas. The company runs bus routes, and a streetcar system, called Galveston Island Trolley.

The system was started in 1893, with its streetcar system.  The Federal Emergency Management Agency (FEMA) and the Federal Transit Authority have agreed to fund the repair of the rail cars, that were damaged in Hurricane Ike.

Bus routes
1 71st St via Market/Broadway
2 UTMB/Ferry Rd

External links
Island Transit Website

References

Bus transportation in Texas
Passenger rail transportation in Texas
Light rail in Texas
Transportation in Galveston, Texas
Companies based in Galveston, Texas
1893 establishments in Texas